Cowboy from Lonesome River is a 1944 American Western film directed by Benjamin H. Kline and written by Luci Ward. The film stars Charles Starrett, Vi Athens, Dub Taylor, Jimmy Wakely, Kenneth MacDonald and Ozie Waters. The film was released on September 21, 1944, by Columbia Pictures.

Plot

Cast          
Charles Starrett as Steve Randall
Vi Athens as Mona Grant
Dub Taylor as Cannonball
Jimmy Wakely as Jimmy Wakely
Kenneth MacDonald as Senator Daniel G. Proctor / Sheppard Proctor
Ozie Waters as Ozie Waters
Art Wenzel as Slim 
Shelby Atchinson as Buck 
Foy Willing as Red 
Al Sloey as Al
Craig Woods as Hawley
Ian Keith as Matt Conway
John Tyrrell as Pop Mason
Bud Geary as Jones
Steve Clark as Sheriff
Jack Rockwell as Rancher Johnson

References

External links
 

1944 films
1940s English-language films
American Western (genre) films
1944 Western (genre) films
Columbia Pictures films
American black-and-white films
1940s American films